Anthony Q. Thompson (born April 8, 1967) is a former professional American football running back and a current pastor at the Lighthouse Community Church in Bloomington, Indiana.

Early life
Thompson was a three-year starter (1983–1985) for Terre Haute North Vigo High School, where he was a Parade All-American under coach Wayne Staley.

College career
Thompson played college football with the Indiana University Hoosiers football program where he won the Maxwell Award and Walter Camp Award in 1989.  He also won the Chicago Tribune Silver Football twice, becoming only the third person to do so at the time (following Paul Giel and Archie Griffin). Thompson finished second in Heisman Trophy voting for the 1989 season. In 1989, he broke the record for career touchdowns in college with 65 touchdowns. The record stood until 1998 when it was broken by Ricky Williams. Thompson finished his college career with 5,299 rushing yards. In 2007, Thompson was inducted into the College Football Hall of Fame.

Statistics
Source:

Professional career
Thompson was selected by the Phoenix Cardinals in the second round of the 1990 NFL Draft. During his NFL career, which ended in 1992 with the Los Angeles Rams, he played in 37 games and scored six touchdowns.

Personal life
Thompson has four children:  two daughters, Teka and Ciara, and two sons, Anthony Jr. and Jacob.

See also
 List of NCAA Division I FBS running backs with at least 50 career rushing touchdowns
 List of NCAA major college football yearly rushing leaders
 List of NCAA major college football yearly scoring leaders

References

External links
 NFL.com player page

1967 births
Living people
All-American college football players
American football running backs
College Football Hall of Fame inductees
Indiana Hoosiers football players
Los Angeles Rams players
Sportspeople from Terre Haute, Indiana
Phoenix Cardinals players
Players of American football from Indiana
Big Ten Athlete of the Year winners